Koli Airfield (also known as Bomber 3 Field) is a former World War II airfield on Guadalcanal, Solomon Islands in the South Pacific, located near Koli Point, eight miles east of Henderson Field, close to the Metapona River to the east and the Naumbu River to the west. The airfield was abandoned after the war and today is almost totally returned to its natural state.

History
This airfield was built for B-24 Liberator heavy bomber operations, primarily by the Thirteenth Air Force. The single strip ran approximately NE to SW (parallel to Carney Airfield) and had several taxiways off both sides. Surfaced by bitumen with metal, Marsden Matting-like material for heavy aircraft and was completed in the middle of 1943.

Units assigned were:
 42d Bombardment Group, 6 June-20 October 1943
 307th Bombardment Group, February 1943-28 January 1944

Disused since the war. Bomber 3 strip was used for drying Copra at the nearby plantation, and parts of the airfield are used as a road.

See also
Carney Airfield
Kukum Field
USAAF in the South Pacific

References

 Maurer, Maurer (1983). Air Force Combat Units Of World War II. Maxwell AFB, Alabama: Office of Air Force History. .
 www.pacificwrecks.com

External links

Airfields of the United States Army Air Forces in the Pacific Ocean theatre of World War II